St. James is a Roman Catholic church in Stratford, Connecticut, part of the  Diocese of Bridgeport.

History 
The Gothic Revival church was designed by J. Gerald Phelan and later redesigned by Andrew G. Patrick.

The Peragallo Organ
The organ was designed by the Peragallo Organ Company of Paterson, NJ, Opus 672. It is a 3 manual and pedal instrument containing 8 ranks of pipework with a total of 415 speaking pipes augmented with 47 digitally sampled ranks for a total of 55 ranks.

References

External links 
  St. James - Website
 Diocese of Bridgeport

Buildings and structures in Stratford, Connecticut
Roman Catholic churches in Connecticut
Gothic Revival church buildings in Connecticut
Roman Catholic Diocese of Bridgeport
Churches in Fairfield County, Connecticut